The men's high jump event at the 2006 World Junior Championships in Athletics was held in Beijing, China, at Chaoyang Sports Centre on 15 and 17 August.

Medalists

Results

Final
17 August

Qualifications
15 August

Group A

Group B

Participation
According to an unofficial count, 36 athletes from 30 countries participated in the event.

References

High jump
High jump at the World Athletics U20 Championships